Proceedings of the Nutrition Society is one of the publications by The Nutrition Society and is a scientific research journal which focuses on "the scientific study of nutrition and its application to the maintenance of human and animal health".

The journal was founded in 1944, merged with the British Journal of Nutrition in 1947, and was re-established in 1953.

References 

English-language journals
Bimonthly journals
Nutrition and dietetics journals
Cambridge University Press academic journals
Publications established in 1944